Mati Kütt (born 5 April 1947, in Tallinn) is an Estonian animated film director, caricaturist and painter.

1974-1994 he worked at Tallinnfilm. Since 1995 he is a freelancer.

Filmography

 1992 "Sprott võtmas päikest"
 1995 "Plekkmäe Liidi"
 2002 "Nööbi odüsseia"
 2006 "Une instituut"

References

Living people
1947 births
Estonian animated film directors
People from Tallinn